EL21 is an electric locomotive produced in the years 1981-1986 by LEW Hennigsdorf for industrial railways. Two hundred and sixty five were built for mining railways in the Soviet Union.

References

Electric locomotives of the Soviet Union
LEW locomotives
Railway locomotives introduced in 1981